Walter Lawrence Burke (August 25, 1908 – August 4, 1984) was an American character actor of stage, film, and television whose career in entertainment spanned over a half century. Although he was a native of New York, Burke's Irish ancestry often led to his being cast in roles as an Irishman or Englishman. His small stature and distinctive voice and face also made him easily recognizable to audiences even when he was performing in minor supporting roles.

Early life and stage career
Walter Burke was born in the Brooklyn borough of New York City to Irish immigrant parents Bedelia (née McNamara) and Thomas Burke. He had one brother and two sisters. His father bred trotting horses, with one farm each in Ireland and Scotland.

Burke began acting on stage as a teenager, making his Broadway debut in Dearest Enemy at the Knickerbocker Theatre during the 1925–1926 season. The following year he performed in the musical revue Padlocks of 1927 at the Shubert Theatre. He then joined the American Opera Company's troupe in January 1928, performing a non-singing role in an English-language adaption of Faust.  He continued with that company through January 1930, taking part in  adaptions of Madame Butterfly and Yolanda of Cyprus at the Casino Theatre. His other Broadway credits included Help Yourself! (1936), Red Harvest (1937), A Hero Is Born (1937), The Old Foolishness (1940), Under This Roof (1942), The Eve of St. Mark (1942-1943), The World's Full of Girls (1943), Sadie Thompson (1944-1945), Up in Central Park (1945-1947), Billy Budd (1951), Three Wishes for Jamie (1952), and Major Barbara (1957).

Film
Burke debuted in Hollywood films in 1948, with The Naked City, and the following year had a memorable role in the Oscar-winning film All the King's Men. Burke would appear in twenty-two more films, and three more Broadway productions, but both film and the stage would soon take a backseat to his television work.

Television
In 1951, Burke played a jockey in the early television series Martin Kane. From then until 1980, he would appear in episodes of 103 different television series, as well as three made-for-television movies. Though never a series regular, he often played different roles in multiple episodes of the same shows. In 1959–60, he appeared five times as Tim Potter in the ABC western series Black Saddle starring Peter Breck. That same season, he appeared on Andrew Duggan's Bourbon Street Beat and  John Cassavetes's  Johnny Staccato detective series. He portrayed defendant Freddie Green in CBS's Perry Mason in the 1959 episode, "The Case of the Jaded Joker," the first of five appearances in diverse roles. Between 1959 and 1969, Burke made guest appearances on five episodes of the western drama series Gunsmoke.

In 1960 he played prosecutor James Blackburn on Perry Mason in "The Case of the Ominous Outcast." Among his other roles he played a panhandler and a private detective. He guest-starred as Hatfield in the 1961 episode "The Drought" of the syndicated western series Two Faces West. In the 1962–1963 season, he appeared on the CBS anthology series The Lloyd Bridges Show. In the 1965–1966 season, Burke appeared on another ABC western, The Legend of Jesse James. Burke played a magician called "Zeno the Great" in a 1965 (first season) episode of Bewitched entitled "It's Magic". He portrayed Alfred Swanson in the 1965 episode "Movie Star Munster" (S1, Ep28) of the television series, The Munsters.
Burke also appeared on an episode of Lost in Space, playing Mr. O.M. in "The Toymaker" (1967). He also appeared in an episode of "Wild Wild West" as the mayor of a town under siege, in Hogan's Heroes as the master safe cracker Alfie the Artiste, and in two episodes of "Bonanza", as Jesse in "Destiny's Child", and as an unsuspecting witness in a trial. Burke performed as well in the Western series The Virginian, portraying the character Billy Neal in the 1970 episode "The Gift".

Personal life 
Burke married Kathryn Patricia Rooney in 1937 and they had four children, Catherine, Margaret, Deborah and Leslie. Kathryn Rooney died by suicide on May 21, 1956, after shooting herself with a .32 special rifle in the family's Henryville, Pennsylvania, home while her husband was working in New York.
 
Burke split most of his later life between Hollywood, where he worked, and his farm in Monroe County, Pennsylvania. While back east, he would sometimes teach dramatics at a local college.

Death 
On August 4, 1984, Burke died from emphysema while living at the Motion Picture & Television Country House and Hospital in Woodland Hills, California.

Broadway stage credits 

 Dearest Enemy, Knickerbocker Theatre, (1925–1926) ... as ensemble
 Padlocks of 1927, Shubert Theatre, (1927) ... as performer
 Faust, Gallo Theatre, (1928) ... as A Soldier
 Madame Butterfly, Casino Theatre, (1930) ... as Registrar
 Yolanda of Cyprus, Casino Theatre, (1930) ... as Tremitus
 Help Yourself, Manhattan Theatre, (1936) ... as Frederick Bittlesby
 Red Harvest, National Theatre, (1937) ... as Courier Rockman
 A Hero Is Born, Adelphi Theater, (1937) ... as William/A Gentleman of Uncertain Age
 The Old Foolishness, Windsor Theatre, (1940) ... as Dan Dorian
 Not in Our Stars, Biltmore Theatre, (1941) ... as Kevlin Hoolihan
 Under This Roof, Windsor Theatre, (1942) ... as Shawn O'Shaughnessy
 The Eve of St. Mark, Cort Theatre, (1942–1943) ... as Private Thomas Mulveroy
 The World's Full of Girls, Royale Theatre, (1943) ... as Nick
 Sadie Thompson, Alvin Theater, (1944–1945) ... as Quartermaster Bates
 Up in Central Park, New Century Theatre (1945–1946) ... as Danny O'Cahane
 Billy Budd, Biltmore Theatre, (1951) ... as O'Daniel
 Three Wishes for Jamie, Mark Hellinger Theatre, (1952) ... as Power O'Malley
 Major Barbara, Martin Beck Theatre, (1956–1957) ... as Snobby Price

Filmography 

 The Naked City (1948) as Pete Backalis (uncredited)
 All the King's Men (1949) as Sugar Boy
 Mystery Street (1950) as Ornithologist
 The Killer That Stalked New York (1950) as Danny the bellhop (uncredited)
 Dark City (1950) as George the Bartender (uncredited)
 Double Deal (1950) as Wally, Karne's thug (uncredited)
 M (1951) as MacMahan
 The Guy Who Came Back (1951) as O'Mara
 Never Love a Stranger (1958) as Jimmy Keough (uncredited)
 The Crimson Kimono (1959) as Ziggy (uncredited)
 Let No Man Write My Epitaph (1960) as Wart
 Jack the Giant Killer (1962) as Garna
 Beauty and the Beast (1962) as Grimaldi
 How the West Was Won (1962) as poker player in wagon (uncredited)
 The Three Stooges Go Around the World in a Daze (1963) as Lory Filch
 The Wheeler Dealers (1963) as Billy Joe (uncredited)
 My Fair Lady (1964) as bystander (uncredited)
 The Plainsman (1966) as Abe Ireland
 Double Trouble (1967) as Mate
 Stranger on the Run (1967, TV Movie) as Abraham Berk
 The President's Analyst (1967) as Henry Lux, FBR Chief
 Support Your Local Sheriff! (1969) as Fred Johnson
 Support Your Local Gunfighter (1970) as Morris
 Chandler (1971) as Zeno
 The Stone Killer (1973) as JD, marijuana dealer

Television credits (partial) 

 Martin Kane: "A Jockey Is Murdered" (1951) ... as Eddie Stevens
 Johnny Midnight as McVey in untitled episode
 Peter Gunn: "The Torch" (1958) ... as Ditto
 Tales of Wells Fargo "The Little Man" (1959) ... as Marty Saunders
 Gunsmoke: "Wind" (1959) ... as a Bystander 
 The Lawless Years: "The Miles Miller Story" (1961) ... as Miles Miller
 Yancy Derringer: "Panic in Town" (1959) ... as Sneaky Joe
 Alcoa Presents: One Step Beyond: "Front Runner" (1959) ... as jockey Sam Barry
 Lawman: "Red Ransom" (1959) ... as Whiskey Jimmie
 Rescue 8: "Left Hook to Hades" (1959) ... as Mike Thompson
 Perry Mason: "The Case of the Jaded Joker" (1959) ... as Freddie Green
 Perry Mason: "The Case of the Ominous Outcast" (1960) ... as James Blackburn
 Sugarfoot: "The Mysterious Stranger" (1959) ... as Bartender
 The Man from Blackhawk: 2 episodes, "Death Is the Best Policy" (1959) as Tyce; "The Harpoon Story" (1960) ... as Tom Abbott
 Gunsmoke: 2 episodes: "Hinka Do" (S5E21 - 1960)... as Herman & "Circus Trick" (S10E20 - 1965)... as  "Mr. Elko"
 The Alaskans: 3 episodes, "The Blizzard" (1959) and "The Devil Made Fire" (1960) ... as Jenks in both segments; "Kangaroo Court" (1960) ... as Sid Queed 
 The Islanders: 2 episodes, "Operation Dollar Sign" and "The Phanton Captain" (1960) ... as Mesrob in both segments  
 77 Sunset Strip: 3 episodes, "The Double Death of Benny Markham (1960) ....as Benny Markham, "The Baker Street Caper" (1962) ... as Riordan, and "Terror in Silence (1963) .... as Joe Dolan
 Rawhide: "The Incident of the Deserter" (1960) ... as Mr. Dimity
 Bat Masterson: "Bat Trap" (1960) ... uncredited
 Tombstone Territory: "Memory" (1960) ... as Harry Ames
 Perry Mason: "The Case of the Missing Melody" (1961) ... as Jack Grabba
 G.E. True: "A Friendly Tribe" (1961) ... as L.B. Prentiss
 Bonanza: 3 episodes, "Bank Run" (1961) .... as Tim O'Brien, "Destiny's Child" (1966) .... as Jesse Pierson, "The Twenty-Sixth Grave" (1972) .... as Campbell
 The Wide Country: "Good Old Uncle Walt" (1962) ... as Tim Mayhew
 Follow the Sun: "Annie Beeler's Place" (1962) ... as Gympy
 Empire: "Where the Hawk Is Wheeling" (1963) ... as Micah 
 The Lloyd Bridges Show: "The Rising Moon" (1963) ... as O'Farrell
 The Outer Limits: "The Mutant" (1964)
 The Outer Limits: "The Invisibles" (1964)
 Perry Mason: "The Case of the Wooden Nickels" (1964) ... as Jerry Kelso - Panhandler 
 Perry Mason: "The Case of the Crafty Kidnapper" (1966) ... as Private Investigator Adams
 This Man Dawson: "Plague" (1960) ... as "Jumpy" Higgins
 The Twilight Zone: "The Big Tall Wish" (1960) ... as Joe Mizell
 Hawaiian Eye: "Talk and You're Dead" (1961) ... as Kilgore
 Have Gun–Will Travel: Season 2; Episode 36 (1963) Mr. Abbott: A school teacher who disclosed information to Paladin about the murder of a man by the ex-sheriff.
 Arrest & Trial: "The Black Flower" (1964) ... as Hoby Osborne
 Mickey with Mickey Rooney: "For the Love of Grandpa Toddie (1964) .... as Grandfather Toddie
 Bewitched:  "It's Magic" (Season 1/Episode 16) (1964) ... . as hapless magician, Zeno the Great The Munsters: "Movie Star Munster" (1965) ... . as Alfred Swanson
 Hogan's Heroes:  "The Safecracker Suite" (Season 1/Episode 27) (1966) ... . as English safecracking master, Alfred Burke a.k.a. Alfie the Artiste
 The Fugitive:  "Joshua's Kingdom" (1966) ... as Doc
 Batman: "Fine-Feathered Finks" and "The Penguin's a Jinx", Episodes 3 and 4 (1966) as Sparrow
 Rango: "The Rustlers" (1967) as Brooks
 Lost in Space:  "The Toymaker" (Season 2/Episode 18) (1967).... as the Toymaker, Mr. O.M. (Old Man)
 The F.B.I.: "The Two Million Dollar Hit" (1974) .... as Arnie Hellings
 I Dream of Jeannie: "One Jeannie Beats Four of a Kind" (1970) ... as The Boss
 The Big Valley (TV series): 4 episodes, "The Iron Box" (1966) ...as Young Billy, "The Disappearance"(1967) ...as George Gates, "Fall of a Hero" (1968) ...as T.J.Dyce, "Point and Counterpoint" (1969) ...as Ned Stokely  
 Voyage to the Bottom of the Sea: "Terrible Leprechaun"(Season4) (1968) ..... as Leprechaun Mickey and Patrik
 Ironside: "All in a Day's work" (Season1 / Episode 21) (1968) ..... as the informer.
 Mission: Impossible: "Image" (Season 6 / Episode 17) (1972) ..... as Nate Ullstead
 Ghost Story "The Concrete Captain" (episode 2) (1972) ... as Daniel
 Adam-12'': "Backup 1-L20" (1972) ... as Billy Fuller

Notes

External links

 
 
 
 
 

1908 births
1984 deaths
American male stage actors
American male film actors
American male radio actors
American male television actors
American people of Irish descent
Deaths from emphysema
Male actors from New York City
People from Brooklyn
20th-century American male actors
Male actors from Los Angeles
Western (genre) television actors